Souzga (Susku) is a rural locality (a selo) and the administrative centre of Souzginskoye Rural Settlement of Mayminsky District, the Altai Republic, Russia. The population was 1267 as of 2016. There are 12 streets.

Geography 
Souzga is located on the Katun River, 17 km south of Mayma (the district's administrative centre) by road. Turbaza "Yunost" is the nearest rural locality.

References 

Rural localities in Mayminsky District